Several Major League Baseball teams have historically carried their games on superstations, which are broadcast television stations that are distributed on a regional or national basis on cable and satellite television.

American League

Boston Red Sox

WSBK-TV (channel 38) in Boston is best known in the market for being the longtime television home of the Boston Red Sox. WSBK became the Red Sox's over-air flagship station in 1975 and continued to carry the team's games for 20 years, until it lost the rights in 1996 to independent station WABU (channel 68, now Ion Television owned-and-operated station WBPX-TV). After a seven-year hiatus, WSBK – in partnership with CBS owned-and-operated sister station WBZ-TV (channel 4) – reassumed over-the-air broadcast rights to the Red Sox in 2003, although its telecasts were limited to Friday night games. Most of the team's games were carried by cable and satellite regional sports network New England Sports Network, which aired the Friday night games outside of the Boston designated market area, effectively resulting in WSBK being blacked out in these areas (the Red Sox maintain an 80% ownership interest in NESN). Among the nationally prominent announcers that have called Red Sox games on the station include Dick Stockton and Sean McDonough. WBZ stopped broadcasting the games after the 2004 season; NESN later announced that WSBK would lose over-the-air rights in early 2006, resulting in the team's game telecasts becoming cable-exclusive.

Chicago White Sox

The Chicago White Sox's game broadcast were originally televised by WGN-TV (channel 9) for 20 seasons from 1948 – the station signed on in April of that year – to 1967. The team's game telecasts moved to then-upstart independent station WFLD (channel 32, now a Fox owned-and-operated station) – which, like WGN-TV, carried White Sox games on more than occasion – in 1968. WGN-TV regained broadcast rights for the White Sox in 1973, and entered into a contractual agreement with then-competing independent WSNS-TV (channel 44, now a Telemundo owned-and-operated station) to have that station carry select games, an arrangement that lasted through the 1980 season. WGN-TV became the exclusive television broadcaster of White Sox games in 1981, before WFLD re-obtained broadcast rights the following year. After an eight-year run on WFLD, the White Sox returned to WGN-TV in 1990 after co-owner Jerry Reinsdorf agreed to long-term deals with the station for both the Sox and his NBA franchise, the Chicago Bulls.

WGN-TV would enter into a programming arrangement with independent station WCIU-TV (channel 26) in July 1999 for that station to carry select White Sox, Chicago Bulls and Chicago Cubs games within the Chicago market that WGN is under contract to produce and air; the agreement was the result of network affiliation contracts with WGN-TV (first with The WB at the time the WCIU deal was made, and now with The CW) limit the number of programming preemptions allowed each year, as well as due to rights restrictions put in place by the National Basketball Association which limit the number of Bulls telecasts aired on WGN's national superstation feed (now known as WGN America) to only fifteen games per season.

Similarly to the Chicago Cubs, White Sox telecasts on WGN America ended in 2014 with the channel's switch to reruns and original programs. The White Sox left WGN-TV after the 2019 season; since 2020, NBC Sports Chicago has aired all White Sox games that are not exclusive to MLB's national broadcasters.

Detroit Tigers

WKBD (channel 50, now a CW owned-and-operated station), which was distributed throughout Michigan as a regional superstation and served as the default Fox affiliate for much of the state until WJBK-TV (channel 2) switched to the network from CBS in December 1994, obtained the broadcast rights to Detroit Tigers baseball games in 1993; the station carried the games from 1994 to 2005. One of the notable Tigers games aired by WKBD was the team's final game played at Tiger Stadium on September 27, 1999.

Los Angeles Angels of Anaheim

Los Angeles independent station KTLA (channel 5) assumed the broadcast television rights to the Los Angeles Angels (now the Los Angeles Angels of Anaheim) in 1964 from competing independent KHJ-TV (channel 9, now KCAL-TV); the team was owned by Gene Autry for much of its tenure as the team's local television broadcaster, Autry had acquired KTLA that year through his media company Golden West Broadcasters. The team's broadcast rights remained with KTLA after Golden West's sale of the station to Tribune Broadcasting in 1983. KTLA lost the then-California Angels's broadcast rights in 1995, with the team moving their game telecasts to KCAL-TV for the 1996 season (that station's owner at the time, The Walt Disney Company, held an ownership interest in the Angels that briefly overlapped with KCAL's contract with the team until the station was sold to Young Broadcasting that year as a result of Disney's purchase of ABC, owners of KABC-TV (channel 7)). KCAL-TV televised the Angels games until the 2005 season.

New York Yankees

New York City independent station WPIX (channel 11) obtained the broadcast rights to the New York Yankees in 1951, and carried the team's games for 47 years until 1998. It was through its coverage of Yankees baseball games that WPIX, which had also for a time aired games from the New York Giants baseball franchise (which later moved to San Francisco), that WPIX gained perhaps its greatest fame and identity. WPIX lost the broadcast television rights to the Yankees to Fox owned-and-operated station WNYW (channel 5) following the 1998 Major League Baseball season, sharing rights with the Madison Square Garden Network, which became the team's exclusive local broadcaster in 2001.

In September 2001, fellow New York superstation WWOR-TV (channel 9, now a MyNetworkTV owned-and-operated station) began airing several Yankees baseball games that were originally scheduled to air on sister station WNYW. WWOR began carrying Yankees games on a full-time basis in 2005, through a production agreement with the YES Network (WWOR's former parent company, News Corporation (which spun off WWOR, WNYW and the remainder of its U.S. entertainment and broadcasting properties – excluding YES Network – to 21st Century Fox in July 2013), would acquire a majority interest in the regional sports network in 2011).  In 2015, after a 17-year absence, the Yankees returned to WPIX through an agreement with YES, similar to the WWOR agreement.

Texas Rangers

Dallas/Fort Worth independent station KTVT (channel 11), which began to distribute its signal through C band satellite services and cable systems across the southwestern United States in the late 1970s, obtained the broadcast rights to the Texas Rangers in 1985, after the team spent the previous ten seasons broadcasting their games over WBAP/KXAS-TV (channel 5), the area's NBC station. Edward L. Gaylord, president of the Oklahoma Publishing Company (corporate sister of the station's then-owner, Gaylord Broadcasting Company), had purchased a minority ownership stake in the team around the time that KTVT began airing the Rangers telecasts. KTVT's status as a regional superstation hampered Gaylord's efforts to purchase a controlling interest in the Rangers, as the league's other team owners already had to contend with superstation coverage of the Atlanta Braves, Chicago Cubs and the New York Mets, and had concerns to about a fourth team join them. KTVT relinquished the Rangers television rights in 1995, as a result of the station's forthcoming affiliation with CBS (as part of a deal between Gaylord Broadcasting and CBS that also involved Seattle sister station KSTW (also on channel 11), stemming that network's longtime Dallas affiliate KDFW (channel 4), switching to Fox through New World Communications affiliation agreement with Fox), with the team moving its games to independent station KXTX-TV (channel 39, now a Telemundo owned-and-operated station), with KXAS also airing a selected portion of games.

National League

Atlanta Braves

After Ted Turner acquired struggling independent station WJRJ-TV (channel 17) in Atlanta in 1970, Turner began developing a sports presence for the station by obtaining the television rights to several of the city's professional sports teams – including the Atlanta Hawks NBA and the Atlanta Flames (now the Calgary Flames) NHL franchises. The first such franchise to join channel 17 occurred in 1972, Turner obtained the local rights to televise games from the city's Major League Baseball franchise, the Atlanta Braves, on what had become WTCG beginning with the 1973 season, moving over to the station from NBC affiliate WSB-TV (channel 2, now an ABC affiliate), which had held television rights to the Braves since the team moved to Atlanta from Milwaukee in 1966 (the radio broadcast rights remained with WSB-TV's sister radio station, WSB (750 AM)). The move surprised Atlanta media observers, especially considering that WTCG lost money ever since Turner took over the station, it was only then just starting to break even and become a competitive outlet. Turner bought the team outright before the 1976 season, mainly as a means to retain rights to the team and to prevent the team from relocating, following dismal attendance during 1974 and 1975 seasons.

The Braves games, among other changes to channel 17's schedule, helped improve the station's fortunes as the decade wore on; during the decade, Turner syndicated Braves telecasts to various television stations throughout Georgia and bordering states (mostly network-affiliated stations, as there were few independent stations in the Southeastern United States at the time), extending as far north as Charlotte, North Carolina – where Turner owned another struggling independent WRET-TV (channel 36, now WCNC-TV), which became the market's NBC affiliate in 1978. Games that were syndicated to these stations consisted of Sunday afternoon events and a single prime time game, with games scheduled during the middle of the week airing mainly during the summer months (when the major broadcast networks were airing reruns); most, if not all, of the other MLB teams regionally syndicated their games in their respective areas of the country.

The Braves would receive national carriage starting with the 1977 season, as Turner uplinked WTCG's signal via satellite for distribution to cable systems throughout the United States on December 17, 1976, turning it into the first national superstation. WTCG discontinued syndicating the Braves telecasts circa 1978–1979, when the station had received significant cable penetration across the Southern states, making the Braves the first team not to provide live coverage of its games to broadcast television stations outside of its home market. During the 1980s and 1990s, the Braves games on what was now WTBS garnered very high ratings, usually around a 2.0 ratings share or at times, even higher. At the time, the station referred to them as "America's team" in a promotional campaign; a likely majority of viewers watching the games resided in the Southeastern U.S. – namely in Georgia, Alabama, Florida, South Carolina and Tennessee – which were among the first states where cable providers began to carry WTCG/WTBS, as Turner Broadcasting steadily struck carriage agreements with cable and satellite providers throughout the country, and also attracted fans living in rural areas that were not within the market of a Major League Baseball franchise.

The games became regionally-exclusive when Turner acquired the rights to a package of regular season games from other Major League Baseball teams and league post-season games (including the Division Series and alternating rights to the League Championship Series with Fox) for WTBS's national TBS feed; these changes were the impetus of Turner's June 2007 decision to separate WTBS from the TBS national feed and convert channel 17 locally into a standalone independent station, as WPCH-TV, on October 1, 2007. After the Meredith Corporation (owners of CBS affiliate WGCL-TV (channel 46)) entered into a local marketing agreement with the Turner Broadcasting System to operate WPCH, production of the Braves telecasts was transferred the latter company's Turner Sports division to regional sports network Fox Sports South. On February 28, 2013, Fox Sports South and SportSouth signed an agreement to acquire the 45-game package held by WPCH, rendering the team's game telecasts cable-exclusive beginning with the 2013 season, ending channel 17's 40-year relationship with the Braves.

Chicago Cubs

WGN-TV has had a long association with the Chicago Cubs, whose games have aired on the station since the station signed on in April 1948; the station's corporate parent, the Tribune Company (which operates WGN-TV through its Tribune Broadcasting subsidiary) purchased the National League franchise in 1981, eventually selling the team to businessman Thomas S. Ricketts in 2008. Legendary Chicago sportscaster Jack Brickhouse, the longtime sports director (and later vice president of sports programming) for WGN-TV and sister radio station WGN 720 AM), served as the play-by-play announcer for both the Chicago Cubs and White Sox until 1967, when the White Sox (for whom Brickhouse performed play-by-play duties for home games) ended their first stint on WGN-TV; Brickhouse primarily called Cubs games until his retirement from broadcasting in 1981. Another legendary sports broadcaster, Harry Caray (who served as a fill-in sports anchor on the station's newscasts during the 1970s) served as the lead play-by-play announcer for the White Sox on television and radio from 1971 to 1981, before joining the Cubs with the 1982 season.

After Brickhouse retired, Caray was asked to replace Brickhouse as the Cubs' lead television announcer. Caray (who was known for memorable signature catchphrases during big plays (such as "Holy Cow!") and performed his unique rendition of "Take Me Out to the Ball Game" during the seventh-inning stretch of each game from the WGN-TV broadcast booth) further established his place among Chicago's most-beloved personalities over the next 16 years, primarily working with analyst Steve Stone. As WGN-TV gained prominence as a national superstation during the 1980s and 1990s (the station was uplinked to satellite as a superstation in October 1978), Caray's fan base – and that of the Cubs – expanded beyond Chicago and the Midwestern United States.

On November 5, 2013, the Cubs exercised an option to opt out of its television contract with WGN-TV following the 2014 season; as part of the move, the team gave the station a 30-day window to make a counteroffer – which, in any instance, would raise the rights fees that the station pays the team from its current annual rate of $20 million – to obtain rights to games starting with the 2015 Major League Baseball season (the opt-out option reduced the duration of an agreement to broadcast Cubs games that regional sports network Comcast SportsNet Chicago does not hold rights to from 2022 to 2019, aligning it with the end of the current term of the cable channel's contract); if WGN-TV opts not to produce a suitable bid or any bid at all, the broadcast rights would be opened up for negotiation with other local broadcast and cable television outlets. However, in January 2014, reports surfaced that the Cubs and WGN-TV discussed an option to allow the station to carry a reduced number of games for the 2015 season onward should the contract be renewed.  In December 2014, the Cubs finalized a new broadcast deal with WGN-TV, in which the station will televise 45 games per season, beginning with the 2015 season. However, because of Tribune's decision to shift WGN America's programming strategy to focus on reruns and original programming, Cubs telecasts (along with those of the White Sox and Bulls) no longer air nationally via WGN America. The broadcasts that air on WGN-TV in the Chicago market are available nationally through MLB Extra Innings on DirecTV and other select providers. The Cubs later ended their association with WGN-TV after the 2019 season; since 2020, the Marquee Sports Network has aired all Cubs games that are not exclusive to one of MLB's national broadcasters.

Colorado Rockies

KWGN-TV (channel 2, now a CW affiliate) in Denver obtained the over-the-air broadcast rights to the Colorado Rockies in 1993 as an independent station. The then-WB affiliate lost the rights to the team's broadcasts after the 2002 season, with the games moving to UPN affiliate KTVD (channel 20, now a MyNetworkTV affiliate) in 2003.

Los Angeles Dodgers

KTLA began carrying Los Angeles Dodgers games beginning with the team's 1993 season, obtaining the television rights from KTTV (channel 11), which had carried the team's games from 1958 (when the team relocated to Los Angeles from Brooklyn, New York) until 1992. KTLA lost the rights in 2001, with games moving to UPN affiliate KCOP-TV (channel 13, now a MyNetworkTV owned-and-operated station) in 2002 to 2005. In 2006, the Dodgers moved their over-the-air broadcasts to CBS Corporation-owned independent station KCAL-TV (channel 9); KCAL broadcast the team's games until the 2013 season, when the Dodgers launched SportsNet LA in partnership with Time Warner Cable.

SportsNet LA would constrain itself from widespread provider availability in Southern California – its distribution is primarily limited to the former Time Warner systems in the region that are now part of Charter Communications' Spectrum service – as Time Warner Cable reportedly proposed a monthly transmission rate estimated at $4.90 per household to other cable and satellite providers (including Cox Communications, Frontier FiOS, AT&T U-verse, DirecTV and Dish Network), with carriage fees increasing over the length of the contract (TWC reduced the fee to $3.50 per household in March 2016, an offer that was rejected; Charter indicated it would restore the carriage fee rate above $4.50 for the 2017 season). This created complaints from fans wanting to watch the final broadcasts of retiring legendary commentator Vin Scully, and led to SportsNet LA entering into an agreement with KTLA owner Tribune Broadcasting on September 2, 2016, in which the station would simulcast six Dodgers games that SportsNet LA was already scheduled to air during the final two weeks of the 2016 regular season. On March 8, 2017, SportsNet LA and KTLA extended their simulcasting arrangement to encompass ten games scheduled to air on the regional sports network during the first five weeks of the 2017 regular season. In 2020, AT&T reached a deal with Spectrum (formed after a merger between Time Warner Cable and Charter) to add SportsNet LA to its services (AT&T TV, AT&T U-verse, and DirecTV, the latter of which has since been spun off); other providers in the Dodgers' market are still in disputes.

New York Mets

WOR-TV (now WWOR-TV, and originally licensed to New York City, before its city of license was moved to nearby Secaucus, New Jersey in 1986) held broadcast rights to New York City's National League baseball teams of the period during the 1950s: it obtained rights to the Brooklyn Dodgers beginning with the 1950 season, followed by the New York Giants beginning in 1951; WOR-TV lost the television rights to both teams when they moved to California (the Dodgers to Los Angeles, and the Giants to San Francisco) after the 1957 season. After a three-year stint carrying the Philadelphia Phillies beginning in 1958, the station began televising games from the New York Mets expansion team in 1962, a relationship that would last until 1998. WPIX subsequently signed an agreement to broadcast Mets games beginning with the 1999 season.

References

Superstations
Superstations in the United States
Superstations